Sanxi Township is a township-level administrative unit under the jurisdiction of Nanfeng County, Fuzhou City, Jiangxi Province, People's Republic of China.

Administrative Divisions 
Sanxi Township administers the following divisions: 

Sanxi Village, Shixing Village, Baicang Village, Chifeng Village, Miaoqian Village, Nanbao Village, Baofeng Village, Huanglianshan Village, Pingshang Village, Junfeng Village, Yunshan Village and Shangtan Village.

References 

Nanfeng County
Fuzhou, Jiangxi